Vanuatu competed in the 2014 Commonwealth Games in Glasgow, Scotland from 23 July – 3 August 2014. A team of 12 athletes in 2 sports are representing the country. Participating in their ninth Commonwealth Games, Vanuatuans have never yet won a medal.

Judo

Men

Table Tennis

Singles

Doubles

Team

Qualification Legend: Q=Main Bracket (medal); qB=Consolation Bracket (non-medal)

References

Nations at the 2014 Commonwealth Games
Vanuatu at the Commonwealth Games
2014 in Vanuatuan sport